Dan Troy (1897 - 18 December 1953) was an Irish hurler who played as a full-back for the Limerick senior team.

Troy was a regular for the Limerick senior hurling team during a successful period between 1918 and 1921. During his inter-county career he won one All-Ireland medal and one Munster medal.

At club level Troy began his career with Newport before later winning two county club championship medals with Claughaun.

References

1897 births
Newport hurlers
Claughaun hurlers
Limerick inter-county hurlers
All-Ireland Senior Hurling Championship winners
Year of death missing